Number 1 Squadron, also known as No. 1 (Fighter) Squadron, is a squadron of the Royal Air Force. It was the first squadron to fly a VTOL aircraft. It currently operates Eurofighter Typhoon aircraft from RAF Lossiemouth.

The squadron motto, In omnibus princeps ("First in all things") reflects the squadron's status as the RAF's oldest unit, having been involved in almost every major British military operation from the First World War to the present time. These include the Second World War, Suez Crisis, Falklands War, Gulf War, Kosovo War, and Operation Telic (Iraq).

History

1878 to 1918
No. 1 Squadron's origins go back to 1878 when its predecessor, No. 1 Balloon Company, was formed at the Royal Arsenal, Woolwich as part of the Balloon Section. On 1 April 1911 the Air Battalion of the Royal Engineers was created. The battalion initially consisted of two companies, with No. 1 Company, Air Battalion taking responsibility for lighter than air flying. The first Officer Commanding was Captain E. M. Maitland.

On 13 May 1912, with the establishment of the Royal Flying Corps, No. 1 Company of the Air Battalion was redesignated No. 1 Squadron, Royal Flying Corps. No. 1 Squadron was one of the original three Royal Flying Corps squadrons. Maitland continued as the new squadron's Officer Commanding and he was promoted to major several days after the establishment of the squadron. It retained the airships Beta and Gamma, adding Delta and Eta, as well as kites and a few spherical balloons. However, in October 1913 a sudden decision was made to transfer all the airships to the Naval Wing of the RFC (which became the Royal Naval Air Service by Admiralty dictat, not Cabinet decision, on 1 July 1914). While retaining kites 1 Squadron was reorganised as an 'aircraft park' for the British Expeditionary Force.

On 1 May 1914, Major Charles Longcroft was appointed as the new squadron commander. Apart from a few weeks as a supernumerary in August and September 1914, Longcroft continued as the squadron commander until January 1915.

The squadron was reformed as an aircraft squadron in August 1914, and equipped with a mixture of Avro 504s and Royal Aircraft Factory B.E.8s, crossed over to France on 7 March 1915, under the command of Major Geoffrey Salmond, later Chief of the Air Staff. It operated mainly in the reconnaissance role, with a few single seat fighters for escort purposes. The squadron was soon thrown into action, taking part in the Battle of Neuve Chapelle in March 1915, and moved to Balleul at the end of the month, remaining there until March 1918, operating from an airfield next to the town's Asylum. In April–May 1915, the squadron flew reconnaissance missions during the Second Battle of Ypres. On 19 August, Salmond was replaced as commander of the squadron by Major Philip Joubert de la Ferté, later an Air Chief Marshal. By October 1915, the squadron had re-equipped with a mixture of various Morane-Saulnier types, with Morane Parasols (Types L and LA) in the Corps Reconnaissance role and Morane-Saulnier N single-seat fighters. The squadron supplemented its Parasols with more modern Morane-Saulnier P parasols and Morane-Saulnier BB biplanes in 1916, although the last LA remained with the squadron until 1917. The squadron became a dedicated fighter squadron on 1 January 1917, flying Nieuport 17s and Nieuport 27.

The obsolete Nieuports were replaced by more modern S.E.5as in January 1918. On incorporation into the RAF on 1 April 1918 the squadron kept its numeral; No 1 Squadron of the Royal Naval Air Service (RNAS) was displaced to become No. 201 Squadron RAF.

No. 1 Squadron had among its ranks no fewer than 31 flying aces. They include Robert A. Birkbeck, Quintin Brand (later Air Vice Marshal), Douglas Cameron, William Charles Campbell, Percy Jack Clayson, Edwin Cole, Philip Fullard (later Air Commodore), Eustace Grenfell, Louis Fleeming Jenkin, Tom Hazell, Harold Albert Kullberg, Charles Lavers, Francis Magoun, Guy Borthwick Moore, Gordon Olley, Harry Rigby, William Wendell Rogers and William Rooper.

Between the wars
The squadron returned to the UK from France in March 1919, being formally disbanded on 20 January 1920. On the next day it reformed at Risalpur in the North West Frontier of India (now part of Pakistan), flying the Sopwith Snipe and from January 1920. It moved to Hinaidi near Baghdad in Iraq in May 1921, to carry out policing duties, retaining its Snipes, although it also received one Bristol Jupiter engined Nieuport Nighthawk for evaluation. It remained in Iraq, carrying out strafing and bombing against hostile tribal forces until November 1926 when it was disbanded.

In early 1927 it was reformed at RAF Tangmere, Sussex as a Home Defence Fighter Squadron, equipped with the Armstrong Whitworth Siskin. After receiving the Hawker Fury Mk.1 in February 1932, the squadron gained a reputation for aerobatics, giving displays throughout the United Kingdom and at the Zürich International Air Meeting in July 1937, where its display impressed but it was clear that it was outclassed by the German Messerschmitt Bf 109 and Dornier Do 17 also displayed at Zurich. The squadron re-equipped with the Hawker Hurricane Mk.I in October 1938.

Second World War

On the outbreak of the Second World War in September 1939 the squadron was deployed to France as part of the RAF Advanced Air Striking Force. In October it flew over enemy territory for the first time and soon claimed its first victory, shooting down a Dornier Do 17 on 31 October. Further successes were made during the Phoney War, until the Battle of France erupted in May 1940. Within a week the squadron was bombed out of its base at Berry-au-Bac, north-west of Paris. A series of retreats followed, ending only when the squadron evacuated from France on 18 June, with a return to Tangmere on 23 June.

In August 1940 the squadron entered the Battle of Britain and was heavily engaged until 9 September, when the squadron was transferred to No. 12 Group and sent to RAF Wittering to refit, rest and recuperate.

It returned to No. 11 Group in early 1941 and was employed in fighter sweeps and bomber escort duties. In February, it began "Rhubarb" (low-level sweeps over occupied territory) and night flying missions, and was re-equipped with the Hurricane IIA. In this period its pilots included Karel Kuttelwascher DFC, who was the RAF's highest-scoring night intruder pilot and highest-scoring Free Czechoslovak pilot.

The squadron carried out night intruder patrols until July 1942, when it was re-equipped with the Hawker Typhoon fighter-bomber and relocated to RAF Acklington, Northumberland where it reverted to daytime operations.

The squadron was equipped with the Supermarine Spitfire Mk.IX in April 1944, and in June began anti-V1 patrols, shooting down 39 flying bombs. Missions were also flown over the Falaise Gap, strafing targets of opportunity. Later in the year it reverted to bomber escort duties, based at Maldegem. It was involved in supporting Operation Market Garden : the parachute drops into the Netherlands, and later in support of the Allied counter-offensive in the Ardennes. The squadron dropped 250 lb bombs on to 'Key Points' (KPs), directed by radar to counter the adverse weather conditions. In May 1945 it converted to the Spitfire Mk.XXI, but these were only used operationally to cover landings on the Channel Islands.

Post-War
In 1946, the Squadron returned to Tangmere and took delivery of its first jet aircraft, the Gloster Meteor. In October 1948, Major Robin Olds, USAF, under the U.S. Air Force/Royal Air Force exchange program, was posted in and flying the Gloster Meteor jet fighter. He eventually served as commander of the Squadron at RAF Station Tangmere, an unusual posting for a non-commonwealth foreigner in peacetime.

The Squadron was then equipped with the Hawker Hunter F.5, which were flown from RAF Akrotiri, Cyprus during the 1956 Suez Crisis. The squadron disbanded on 23 June 1958. However, on 1 July 1958 the squadron was reformed by re-numbering No. 263 Squadron at RAF Stradishall. It then moved to RAF Waterbeach from where, flying the Hunter FGA.9, it operated in the ground attack role as part of No. 38 Group. The Squadron continued in this role for the next eight years, operating out of Waterbeach and then RAF West Raynham. Flight Lieutenant Alan Pollock of No. 1 Squadron was responsible for the infamous and very unofficial flying display on the 50th anniversary of the RAF in 1968.

Harrier

Under the command of Squadron Leader Bryan Baker, the squadron became the world's first operator of a V/STOL aircraft with the arrival of the Hawker Siddeley Harrier in 1969, declared operational the following year. A detachment from No. 1 Squadron was deployed aboard the Carrier Battle Group (TG 317.8) of the Falklands Task Force during the Falklands War, operating from HMS Hermes and flying ground attack missions against Argentine forces. It replaced its first generation Harriers with Harrier IIs from 23 November 1988, being declared fully operational on the Harrier GR.5 on 2 November 1989. The squadron was the subject of an episode of the BBC documentary series Defence of the Realm before and during its participation in the Bosnian War as part of NATO's Operation Deny Flight. During the Kosovo war the Squadron flew sorties as part of NATO's Operation Allied Force.

No. 1 Squadron left the "home of the Harrier" at RAF Wittering for RAF Cottesmore on 28 July 2000. Cottesmore became home to all operational RAF Harrier squadrons – No. 20 (Reserve) Squadron, later renumbered as No. 4 (R) Squadron, the Harrier Operational Conversion Unit remained at Wittering. The squadrons both flew missions during the Iraq War and were awarded the "Iraq 2003" battle honour.

The squadron was awarded a battle honour in March 2020, recognising its role in the War in Afghanistan.

One outcome of the Strategic Defence and Security Review by the coalition government in 2010 was the decision to take the RAF's Harriers out of service almost immediately. All Harrier units, including No. 1 (F) Squadron, ceased Harrier flying on 15 December 2010, with No. 1 (F) Squadron formally disbanding on 28 January 2011.

Typhoon

On 15 September 2012, the squadron reformed on the Eurofighter Typhoon at RAF Leuchars. The squadron participated in multiple exercises in foreign countries including Exercise Shaheen Star in the United Arab Emirates during January 2013 and Exercise Bersama Shield in Malaysia during March 2013.

On 8 September 2014, No. 1 (F) Squadron relocated to RAF Lossiemouth, to operate alongside No. 6 and XV (R) squadrons, as well as "D" Flight, No. 202 Squadron (SAR) and No. 5 Force Protection Wing.

On 14 November 2019 the squadron deployed 4 fighters to Keflavik Air Base as part of the NATO Air Policing, Iceland.  The squadron also deployed an additional 100 personnel to support the squadron and forces based in Iceland.

Aircraft operated

 Avro 504 (1915–1916)
 B.E.8 (1915–1916)
 Morane Parasol (1915–1916)
 Nieuport 17 (1916–1917)
 Nieuport 27 (1917–1918)
 SE5a (1918–1920)
 Sopwith Snipe (1920–1927)
 Armstrong Whitworth Siskin (1927–1933)
 Hawker Fury (1933–1937)
 Hawker Hurricane (1937–1943)
 Hawker Typhoon (1943–1944)
 Supermarine Spitfire (1944–1950)
 Gloster Meteor F.8 (1950–1957)
 Hawker Hunter F.5/F.6/FGA.9/T.7 (1957–1970)
 Hawker Siddeley Harrier GR.1 and GR.3 (1969–1989)
 British Aerospace Harrier GR5, GR7 and GR9 (1988–2010)
 Eurofighter Typhoon FGR4 (2012 – present)

Battle honours
The battle honours awarded to No. 1 Squadron are:

Western Front 1915–1918
Ypres 1915
Neuve Chapelle
Loos
Somme 1916
Arras
Ypres 1917
Lys
Amiens
Somme 1918
Hindenburg Line
Independent Force and Germany 1918
Kurdistan 1922–1925
Iraq 1923–1925
France and Low Countries 1939–1940Battle of Britain 1940
Channel and North Sea 1941–1945
Home Defence 1940–1945Fortress Europe 1941–1944Arnhem
Normandy 1944France and Germany 1944–1945Biscay 1944–1945
RhineSouth Atlantic 1982KosovoIraq 2003'Items in bold are permitted to be displayed on the squadron standard

Commanding officers
List of commanding officers of No. 1 Squadron, including date of appointment, sourced from Halley, ShawShaw 1986, p. 188. and Franks & O'Connor.

 Major E M Maitland (13 May 1912)
 Major C A H Longcroft (1 May 1914)
 Major W G H Salmond (28 January 1915)
 Major P B Joubert de la Ferté (19 August 1915)
 Major G F Pretyman (24 November 1915)
 Major G C St P de Dombasle (24 December 1916)
 Major A Barton-Adams (20 June 1917)
 Major W E Young (3 August 1918)
 Squadron Leader J O Andrews (21 January 1920)
 Squadron Leader J B Graham (18 September 1920)
 Squadron Leader G G A Williams (10 November 1922)
 Squadron Leader E O Grenfell (8 October 1923)
 Squadron Leader E D Atkinson (25 May 1924)
 Squadron Leader C.N. Lowe (19 April 1926)
 Squadron Leader E D Atkinson (11 April 1927)
 Squadron Leader E O Grenfell (19 March 1928)
 Squadron Leader C B S Spackman (27 July 1931)
 Squadron Leader R W Chappell (21 November 1933)
 Squadron Leader C W Hill (1 October 1934)
 Flight Lieutenant T N McEvoy (acting) (31 January 1936)
 Squadron Leader C W Hill (1 December 1936)
 Squadron Leader F R D Swain (12 April 1937)
 Squadron Leader I A Bertram (15 January 1938)
 Squadron Leader P J H Halahan (17 April 1939)
 Squadron Leader D A Pemberton (24 May 1940)
 Squadron Leader M H Brown (10 November 1940)
 Squadron Leader R E P Brooker (23 April 1941)
 Squadron Leader J A F MacLachlan (3 November 1941)
 Squadron Leader R C Wilkinson (31 July 1942)
 Squadron Leader A Zweigbergh (30 May 1943)
 Squadron Leader J Checketts (3 April 1944)
 Squadron Leader H P Lardner-Burke (29 April 1944)
 Squadron Leader D G S R Cox (11 January 1945)
 Squadron Leader R S Nash (21 April 1945)
 Squadron Leader H R Allen (9 January 1946)
 Squadron Leader C H MacFie (26 October 1946)
 Flight Lieutenant N H D Ramsey (acting) (7 May 1947)
 Squadron Leader T R Burne (15 July 1947)
 Major R Olds (USAF) (4 February 1949)
 Squadron Leader T R Burne (1 October 1949)
 Major D F Smith (USAF) (10 January 1950)
 Squadron Leader J L W Ellacombe (18 August 1950)
 Squadron Leader R B Morison (21 November 1952)
 Squadron Leader D I Smith (27 July 1953)
 Squadron Leader F W Lister (1 December 1953)
 Flight Lieutenant H Irving (acting) (1 June 1955)
 Squadron Leader R S Kingsford (8 August 1956)
 Squadron Leader L de Garis, AFC (5 July 1958)
 Squadron Leader J J Phipps (1 December 1958)
 Squadron Leader P V Pledger (1 January 1961)
 Squadron Leader F L Travers-Smith (1 January 1963)
 Squadron Leader D C G Brook (28 December 1964)
 Squadron Leader G. Jones (1 November 1966)
 Squadron Leader L A B Baker (20 September 1968)
 Wing Commander J A Mansell (10 April 1969)
 Squadron Leader L A B Baker (21 May 1969)
 Wing Commander D Allison (4 August 1969)
 Squadron Leader L A B Baker (October 1969)
 Wing Commander K W Hayr (1 January 1970)
 Wing Commander E J E Smith (6 January 1972)
 Wing Commander P P W Taylor (3 December 1973)
 Wing Commander J G Saye (9 July 1976)
 Wing Commander R B Duckett (17 July 1978)
 Wing Commander P T Squire (26 March 1981)
 Wing Commander J D L Feesey (23 December 1983)
 Wing Commander I M Stewart (13 June 1986)
 Wing Commander I R Harvey (3 October 1988)
 Wing Commander C C N Burwell (17 May 1991)
 Wing Commander D Walker (29 April 1994)
 Wing Commander M A Leakey (18 March 1996)
 Wing Commander I Cameron (acting) (26 November 1997)
 Wing Commander A Golledge (9 January 1998)
 Wing Commander S M Bell (26 October 1999)
 Wing Commander M E Sampson (June 2004)
 Wing Commander K A Lewis (1 November 2006)
 Wing Commander D F Haines (31 October 2008)
 Wing Commander M Flewin (15 September 2012)
 Wing Commander M Sutton (9 October 2014)

 Notes 

References
Citations

Bibliography

 Ashworth, Chris. Encyclopedia of Modern Royal Air Force Squadrons. Wellingborough, UK:PSL, 1989. .
 Bowyer, Michael J.F and John D.R. Rawlings. Squadron Codes, 1937–56. Cambridge, Cambridgeshire, UK: Patrick Stephens Ltd., 1979. .
 Bruce, J. M. The Aeroplanes of the Royal Flying Corps (Military Wing). London: Putnam, 1982. .
 Evans, Andy. BAE/McDonnell Douglas Harrier. Malborough, Wiltshire, UK: The Crowood Press, 1998. .
 Flintham, Vic and Andrew Thomas. Combat Codes: A Full Explanation and Listing of British, Commonwealth and Allied Air Force Unit Codes Since 1938. Shrewsbury, Shropshire, UK: Airlif Publishing Ltd., 2003. .
 Franks, Norman and Mike O'Connor. Number One in War and Peace: The History of No. 1 Squadron, 1912–2000. London: Grub Street, 2000. .
 Halley, James J. Famous Fighter Squadrons of the RAF: Volume 1. Windsor, UK: Hylton Lacey, 1971. .
 Halley, James J. The Squadrons of the Royal Air Force & Commonwealth, 1918–1988. Tonbridge, Kent, UK: Air-Britain (Historians) Ltd., 1988. .
 Jefford, C.G. RAF Squadrons, a Comprehensive Record of the Movement and Equipment of all RAF Squadrons and their Antecedents since 1912. Shrewsbury: Airlife Publishing, 1998 (second edition 2001). .
 Rawlings, John D.R. Coastal, Support and Special Squadrons of the RAF and their Aircraft. London: Jane's Publishing Company Ltd., 1982. .
 Rawlings, John D.R. Fighter Squadrons of the RAF and their Aircraft. London: Macdonald and Jane's (Publishers) Ltd., 1969 (new edition 1976, reprinted 1978). .
 Shaw, Michael. No. 1 Squadron. Shepperton, Surrey, UK: Ian Allan Ltd., 1986. .
 Shaw, Michael. Twice Vertical: The History of No. 1 Squadron Royal Air Force. London: Macdonald & Company Ltd, 1971. .
 Shores, Christopher; Franks, Norman & Guest, Russell. Above The Trenches: A Complete Record of the Fighter Aces and Units of the British Empire Air Forces 1915–1920''. London: Grub Street, 1990. .

External links

Official website
No.1 (F) Sqn Association

Military units and formations established in 1911
Royal Flying Corps squadrons
Royal Air Force aircraft squadrons
Military units and formations of the United Kingdom in the Falklands War
Military units and formations disestablished in 2011
RAF squadrons involved in the Battle of Britain
1911 establishments in the United Kingdom